Abdelatif Sadiki (Arabic: عبد اللطيف الصديقي; born 15 January 1999) is a Moroccan runner.

He won the silver medal in the 1,500 meters at the Pan Arab Athletics Championships 2021 in Rades.

Sadiki represented Morocco at the 2020 Summer Olympics, where he competed in the men's 1500m.

References

External links

 
 
 

 

Living people
1999 births
Moroccan male middle-distance runners
Olympic athletes of Morocco
Athletes (track and field) at the 2020 Summer Olympics
Athletes (track and field) at the 2022 Mediterranean Games
Mediterranean Games silver medalists for Morocco
Mediterranean Games medalists in athletics